David Andrew Patterson (born November 16, 1947) is an American computer pioneer and academic who has held the position of professor of computer science at the University of California, Berkeley since 1976. He announced retirement in 2016 after serving nearly forty years, becoming a distinguished software engineer at Google. He currently is vice chair of the board of directors of the RISC-V Foundation, and the Pardee Professor of Computer Science, Emeritus at UC Berkeley.

Patterson is noted for his pioneering contributions to reduced instruction set computer (RISC) design, having coined the term RISC, and by leading the Berkeley RISC project. As of 2018, 99% of all new chips use a RISC architecture. He is also noted for leading the research on redundant arrays of inexpensive disks (RAID) storage, with Randy Katz.

His books on computer architecture, co-authored with John L. Hennessy, are widely used in computer science education. Hennessy and Patterson won the 2017 Turing Award for their work in developing RISC.

Early life and education
David Patterson grew up in Evergreen Park, Illinois. He attended the University of California, Los Angeles (UCLA), receiving his Bachelor of Arts degree in Mathematics in 1969. He continued on to obtain his Master of Science degree in 1970 and PhD in 1976, both in Computer Science at UCLA. Patterson's PhD was advised by David F. Martin and Gerald Estrin.

Research and career 
Patterson is an important advocate and developer of the concept of reduced instruction set computing and coined the term "RISC". He led the Berkeley RISC project from 1980, with Carlo H. Sequin, where the technique of register windows was introduced. He is also one of the innovators of the redundant arrays of independent disks (RAID) together with Randy Katz and Garth Gibson. Patterson also led the Network of Workstations (NOW) project at Berkeley, an early effort in the area of computer clustering.

Past positions
Past chair of the Computer Science Division at U.C. Berkeley and the Computing Research Association, he served on the Information Technology Advisory Committee for the U.S. President (PITAC) during 2003–05 and was elected president of the Association for Computing Machinery (ACM) for 2004–06.

Notable PhD students
He has advised several notable Ph.D. students, including:
 David Ditzel, founder and former president of Transmeta
 Garth A. Gibson, co-inventor of redundant array of inexpensive disks (RAID), founder and CTO of Panasas, professor at Carnegie Mellon University, and first president and chief executive officer of the Vector Institute
 Christos Kozyrakis, professor at Stanford University
 David Ungar, designer of the Self programming language, and currently researcher at IBM Research
 Remzi Arpaci-Dusseau, Grace Wahba professor and Chair of Computer Sciences at UW-Madison.
 Robert Yung, CTO of PMC-Sierra

Selected publications
Patterson co-authored seven books, including two with John L. Hennessy on computer architecture: Computer Architecture: A Quantitative Approach (6 editions—latest is ) and Computer Organization and Design RISC-V Edition: the Hardware/Software Interface (5 editions—latest is ). They have been widely used as textbooks for graduate and undergraduate courses since 1990. His most recent book is with Andrew Waterman on the open architecture RISC-V: The RISC-V Reader: An Open Architecture Atlas (1st Edition).

His articles include:

Awards and honors
Patterson's work has been recognized by about 35 awards for research, teaching, and service, including Fellow of the Association for Computing Machinery (ACM) and the Institute of Electrical and Electronics Engineers (IEEE), and by election to the National Academy of Engineering, National Academy of Sciences, and the Silicon Valley Engineering Hall of Fame. In 2005, he and Hennessy shared Japan's Computer & Communication award and, in 2006, he was elected to the American Academy of Arts and Sciences and the National Academy of Sciences and received the Distinguished Service Award from the Computing Research Association.
 In 2007 he was named a Fellow of the Computer History Museum "for fundamental contributions to engineering education, advances in computer architecture, and the integration of leading-edge research with education." That same year, he was also named a Fellow of the American Association for the Advancement of Science. In 2008, he won the ACM Distinguished Service Award, the ACM-IEEE Eckert-Mauchly Award, and was recognized by the School of Engineering at UCLA for Alumni Achievement in Academia. Since then he has won the ACM-SIGARCH Distinguished Service Award, ACM-SIGOPS Hall of Fame Award, and the 2012 Jean-Claude Laprie Award in Dependable Computing from IFIP Working Group 10.4 on Dependable Computing and Fault Tolerance. In 2016 he was given the Richard A. Tapia Achievement Award for Scientific Scholarship, Civic Science and Diversifying Computing. For 2020 he was awarded the BBVA Foundation Frontiers of Knowledge Award in Information and Communication Technologies.

In 2013, he set the American Powerlifting Record for the state of California for his weight class and age group in bench press, dead lift, squat, and all three combined lifts.

On February 12, 2015, IEEE installed a plaque at UC Berkeley to commemorate the contribution of RISC-I in Soda Hall at UC Berkeley. The plaque reads:
 IEEE Milestone in Electrical and Computer Engineering
 First RISC (Reduced Instruction Set Computing) Microprocessor
''UC Berkeley students designed and built the first VLSI reduced instruction-set computer in 1981. The simplified instructions of RISC-I reduced the hardware for instruction decode and control, which enabled a flat 32-bit address space, a large set of registers, and pipelined execution. A good match to C programs and the Unix operating system, RISC-I influenced instruction sets widely used today, including those for game consoles, smartphones and tablets.

On March 21, 2018,  he was awarded the 2017 ACM A.M. Turing Award together with John L. Hennessy for developing RISC. The award attributed them for pioneering "a systematic, quantitative approach to the design and evaluation of computer architectures with enduring impact on the microprocessor industry".

In 2022 he was awarded the Charles Stark Draper Prize by the National Academy of Engineering alongside John L. Hennessy, Steve Furber and Sophie Wilson for contributions to the invention, development, and implementation of reduced instruction set computer (RISC) chips.

Charitable work
From 2003 to 2012 he rode in the annual Waves to Wine MS charity event as part of Bike MS; a 2-day cycling adventure. He was the top fundraiser in 2006, 2007, 2008, 2009, 2010, 2011, and 2012.

References

Computer designers
American computer scientists
1947 births
Living people
Fellows of the Association for Computing Machinery
Presidents of the Association for Computing Machinery
Scientists from California
Members of the United States National Academy of Engineering
Members of the United States National Academy of Sciences
UC Berkeley College of Engineering faculty
University of California, Los Angeles alumni
People from Evergreen Park, Illinois
20th-century American scientists
21st-century American scientists
Computer science educators
Turing Award laureates